In mathematics, twisted K-theory (also called K-theory with local coefficients) is a variation on K-theory, a mathematical theory from the 1950s that spans algebraic topology, abstract algebra and operator theory.

More specifically, twisted K-theory with twist H is a particular variant of K-theory, in which the twist is given by an integral 3-dimensional cohomology class. It is special among the various twists that K-theory admits for two reasons.  First, it admits a geometric formulation. This was provided in two steps; the first one was done in 1970 (Publ. Math. de l'IHÉS) by Peter Donovan and Max Karoubi; the second one in 1988 by Jonathan Rosenberg in Continuous-Trace Algebras from the Bundle Theoretic Point of View.

In physics, it has been conjectured to classify D-branes, Ramond-Ramond field strengths and in some cases even spinors in type II string theory. For more information on twisted K-theory in string theory, see K-theory (physics).

In the broader context of K-theory, in each subject it has numerous isomorphic formulations and, in many cases, isomorphisms relating definitions in various subjects have been proven.  It also has numerous deformations, for example, in abstract algebra K-theory may be twisted by any integral cohomology class.

The definition
To motivate Rosenberg's geometric formulation of twisted K-theory, start from the Atiyah–Jänich theorem, stating that

the Fredholm operators on Hilbert space , is a classifying space for ordinary, untwisted K-theory. This means that the K-theory of the space  consists of the homotopy classes of maps

A slightly more complicated way of saying the same thing is as follows. Then the K-theory of  consists of the homotopy classes of sections of this bundle.

We can make this yet more complicated by introducing a trivial

Then the group of maps

This more complicated construction of ordinary K-theory is naturally generalized to the twisted case. This is a consequence of the fact that  topologically is a representative Eilenberg–MacLane space

.

The generalization is then straightforward. Rosenberg has defined

,

Equivalently, it is the space of homotopy classes of sections of the  bundles associated to a  bundle with class .

What is it?

When  is the trivial class, twisted K-theory is just untwisted K-theory, which is a ring. However, when  is nontrivial this theory is no longer a ring. It has an addition, but it is no longer closed under multiplication.

This element can be constructed directly from the above definition by using adjoints of Fredholm operators and construct a specific 2 x 2 matrix out of them (see the reference 1, where a more natural and general Z/2-graded version is also presented). In particular twisted K-theory is a module over classical K-theory.

How to calculate it

Physicist typically want to calculate twisted K-theory using the Atiyah–Hirzebruch spectral sequence. The idea is that one begins with all of the even or all of the odd integral cohomology, depending on whether one wishes to calculate the twisted  or the twisted , and then one takes the cohomology with respect to a series of differential operators. The first operator, for example, is the sum of the three-class , which in string theory corresponds to the Neveu-Schwarz 3-form, and the third Steenrod square, soNo elementary form for the next operator, has been found, although several conjectured forms exist. Higher operators do not contribute to the -theory of a 10-manifold, which is the dimension of interest in critical superstring theory.

After taking the cohomology with respect to the full series of differentials one obtains twisted -theory as a set, but to obtain the full group structure one in general needs to solve an extension problem.

Example: the three-sphere
Thus the even and odd cohomologies are both isomorphic to the integers. Because the three-sphere is of dimension three, which is less than five, the third Steenrod square is trivial on its cohomology and so the first nontrivial differential is just . The later differentials increase the degree of a cohomology class by more than three and so are again trivial; thus the twisted -theory is just the cohomology of the operator  which acts on a class by cupping it with the 3-class .

Imagine that  is the trivial class, zero. Then  is also trivial. Thus its entire domain is its kernel, and nothing is in its image. This leaves the original odd cohomology, which is again the integers. As expected, this agrees with the untwisted -theory.

In conclusionIn string theory this result reproduces the classification of D-branes on the 3-sphere with  units of -flux, which corresponds to the set of symmetric boundary conditions in the supersymmetric  WZW model at level .

There is an extension of this calculation to the group manifold of SU(3).

See also
K-theory (physics)
Wess–Zumino–Witten model
Bundle gerbe

Notes

References
"Graded Brauer groups and K-theory with local coefficients", by Peter Donovan and Max Karoubi. Publ. Math. IHÉS Nr. 38, pp. 5–25 (1970).
D-Brane Instantons and K-Theory Charges by Juan Maldacena, Gregory Moore and Nathan Seiberg
Twisted K-theory and Cohomology by Michael Atiyah and Graeme Segal
Twisted K-theory and the K-theory of Bundle Gerbes by Peter Bouwknegt, Alan Carey, Varghese Mathai, Michael Murray and Danny Stevenson.
Twisted K-theory, old and new

External links
Strings 2002, Michael Atiyah lecture, "Twisted K-theory and physics"
The Verlinde algebra is twisted equivariant K-theory (PDF)
Riemann–Roch and index formulae in twisted K-theory (PDF)

K-theory